East Kilbride is the largest town in South Lanarkshire in Scotland, and the country's sixth-largest locality by population. It was also designated Scotland's first new town on 6 May 1947.

The town ends close to the White Cart Water to the west and is bounded by the Rotten Calder Water to the east. Immediately to the north of the modern town centre is The Village, the part of East Kilbride that existed before its post-war development into a New Town. East Kilbride is twinned with the town of Ballerup, in Denmark.

History and prehistory
The earliest-known evidence of occupation in the area dates as far back as the late Neolithic and Early Bronze Age, as archaeological investigation has demonstrated that burial cairns in the district began as ceremonial or ritual sites of burial during the Neolithic, with the use of cup-marked, and other inscribed stones at key elevated sites, only to be later built upon with earth and re-used for burial into the Bronze Age. These findings have found further support through ongoing research indicating that many East Kilbride Cairns first noticed by the Reverend David Ure in his History of Rutherglen and East Kilbride (1793), are embedded, alongside other monuments, into a ritual landscape related to ancestor cults and relationships with key topographical features and annual solar events. A flint arrow head was discovered by Allan Forrest, a then child resident whilst groundworks were taking place in his family's garden at Glen Bervie, St Leonards in 1970 which later was identified as dating to 1500 BC (Bronze Age). Ancient graves have also been found near the Kype Water to the south of the town near Strathaven, and Roman coins, lamps, and footwear have also been found in the area.

East Kilbride traditionally takes its name from an Irish saint named St Bride (or Brigit), who may have founded a monastery for nuns and monks in Kildare in Leinster, Ireland, in the 6th century. Dál Riatan monks afterwards introduced her order to Scotland. The anglicisation Kil takes its root from the early Celtic monastics that St Brigit is representative of: the Culdees or Céli Dé. The Céile Dé were 'the clients or companions of God'. In modern Gaelic, Cille Bhrìghde translates similarly as 'the clients or companions of Brigit', and can be interpreted as the 'church of Bride' or 'burial place dedicated to Bride'. Alternatively, the later dedication may commemorate the Scottish St Bryde, who was born in 451 AD and died at Abernethy 74 years later. Culdee-type Christian settlements were essential to the spread of the Celtic church in Scotland, with small pagan sites being converted and chapels or cells forming little more than crude shelters, or timber and turf buildings with crude circular enclosures. The evidence of Culdee-type small-scale habitation is supported by the number of early stone cross sites around East Kilbride, and their associated holy fonts, springs, and both with pre-canonisation saintly dedications.

The word 'East' was added to the name of East Kilbride, and 'West' to West Kilbride to distinguish the towns from each other.

The original parish church was located on what is believed to be the site of a pre-Christian sacred area, which is possibly the origin of the association with St Brigit, since the site may be dedicated to the Celtic goddess Brigid, whose traditions have been continued through the reverence of St Brigit brought on by the Celtic Church.

East Kilbride grew from a small village of around 900 inhabitants in 1930 to become a large burgh in 1967. The rapid industrialisation of the 20th century underpins this growth and left much of the working population throughout Scotland's Central Belt, from Glasgow to Edinburgh, living in the housing stock built at the end of the previous century. The Great War postponed any housing improvements, as did the Treaty of Versailles and the period of post-war settlement it created. In turn, this was followed by the Great Depression. After the Second World War, Glasgow, already suffering from chronic housing shortages, incurred bomb damage from the war. In 1946, the Clyde Valley Regional Plan allocated sites where overspill satellite "new towns" could be constructed to help alleviate the housing shortage. Glasgow would also undertake the development of its peripheral housing estates. East Kilbride was the first of six new towns in Scotland to be designated, in 1947, followed by Glenrothes (1948), Cumbernauld (1956), Livingston (1962), Irvine (1964) and Stonehouse (1972), although Stonehouse new town was never built.

The planned town has been subdivided into residential precincts, each with its own local shops, primary schools and community facilities. The housing precincts surround the shopping centre, which is bound by a ring road. Industrial estates were concentrated on the outskirts of the town in northern, western and south-eastern directions (Nerston, College Milton and Kelvin respectively).

The Calderglen gorge bordering the eastern fringe of East Kilbride, was celebrated in a high number of printed works as a picturesque forest and 'magnificent in its grouping of craggy heights, sprinkled with trees and [...] the richly wooded and festooned valley', and with 'delightful cascades', and described as indescribable, or as 'the GRAND, the ROMANTIC, and BEAUTIFUL' - the latter being the only part of David Ure's book where he emphasised the descriptive characteristics of a place in bold characters. The northern part of the gorge and adjoining Calderwood, the gorge's namesake, was the home of an ancient family known as the 'Maxwells of Calderwood' who resided in Calderwood Castle, and were the oldest branch of the Maxwells of Pollok. The remnants of Calderwood Castle were demolished in 1951 and only a few parts of the structure remain. Calderglen Heritage formally constituted in early 2017 as a body to protect, record, and restore local and national interest in the areas of the former Calderwood and Torrance estates of Calderglen.

The story of how workers at the Rolls-Royce factory in East Kilbride prevented engines for military jets being serviced and supplied between 1974 until 1978 to the Chilean military dictatorship is told in the 2018-released documentary, Nae Pasaran. The factory was scheduled for closure in 2017 and was subsequently demolished and the land (at Nerston Industrial Estate) used for housing; a monument consisting of one of the unrepaired engines was installed at the town's South Lanarkshire College in 2019.

Geography

The A725 road linking the towns also passes Blantyre and one of the University of the West of Scotland campuses, with links to Bothwell, Motherwell and ultimately to the M74 and M8 motorways.

Rutherglen and Cambuslang lie about the same distance to the north-east and are linked to East Kilbride via the dual carriageway A749 road which continues into Glasgow.

The majority of land in the area in between is taken up by Whitelee Wind Farm on the moorland hills to the southwest, including Elrig close to where one of the principal feeder burns of the Calder Water originates. The Calder itself flows northwards past East Kilbride adjacent to Blantyre, before joining the River Clyde opposite Daldowie near Newton.

East Kilbride is often considered to form part of the Greater Glasgow conurbation. However, the urban area is not directly connected to any other, being designed from the outset to serve as a self-contained town with some commute requirements to Glasgow. The hamlets of Nerston, Kittochside, Auldhouse and Jackton which were once separate settlements are now on the periphery of the expanding town.

East Kilbride is divided into a number of smaller neighbourhoods bordered by main through-roads. Part of the new town design was that each of these would be a self-contained entity, with a variety of housing types, local shops and primary schools, and accessed safely for pedestrians via paths and underpasses separate from main roads. This is true for the original areas of the new town (principally Calderwood, Greenhills, The Murray, St Leonards and Westwood) while newer developments, such as Stewartfield, Lindsayfield and Mossneuk do not adhere as closely to this model and have a more generic suburban layout of low-density private housing, arranged mainly in cul-de-sacs fed by distributor roads.

Governance

East Kilbride Civic Centre, which was commissioned by the burgh of East Kilbride was designed by Scott Fraser & Browning, built by Holland, Hannen & Cubitts and completed in 1968. From 1975 East Kilbride lent its name to a local government district in the Strathclyde region. From creation until 1980 the East Kilbride District Council was governed by the Scottish National Party (SNP), subsequently, until dissolution, the district was under the control of Labour. In 1996, administrative functions were taken over by the South Lanarkshire unitary council.

There is an East Kilbride constituency of the Scottish Parliament. From the opening of the Scottish Parliament, the constituency was represented by Andy Kerr MSP (Labour), until May 2011 when the seat was won by Linda Fabiani MSP (Scottish National Party).

East Kilbride was formerly a constituency of the UK Parliament. In 2005 it was replaced by the constituency of East Kilbride, Strathaven and Lesmahagow. The seat was held from 1987 to 2010 by Labour politician, Adam Ingram. In the 2010 election Labour politician, Michael McCann, previously a South Lanarkshire Councillor was elected as the MP for the area. In the 2015 election, Lisa Cameron for the SNP was elected as part of the landslide victory the party had in Scotland, the seat was held with a reduced majority in 2017.

Leisure and culture
East Kilbride as a new town was designed to provide elements of culture, sport, and heritage for residents so as to create a sense of belonging and place  Key cultural facilities in the town include the Dollan Aqua Centre. This building is regarded as an outstanding and rare example of a mid-20th century public amenity building in a striking internationally inspired design. It was the first champion-sized swimming pool in Scotland and was inspired by Pier Luigi Nervi's Olympic complex in Rome; it is also very similar to the Olympic complex built for the 1964 Japanese Olympic Games.

The town is also home to the popular arts and performance venue The East Kilbride Arts Centre, as well as the longstanding Village Theatre.

East Kilbride is home to the National Museum of Rural Life, located at Wester Kittochside farm.

The only other museum in East Kilbride was the Hunter House Museum, which closed after the financial crash to later open again as a cafe. East Kilbride Central Library holds the reference collections and some archival materials representing some of the history of both East Kilbride new town and the earlier village, whilst South Lanarkshire Archives based at College Milton holds more extensive original documents for public consultation.

The town also hosted the National Mòd in 1975.

Economy

The town centre is occupied by a large shopping centre comprising six linked malls (The Plaza (development started in 1972), Princes Mall (1984), Southgate (1989), Princes Square (1997), Centre West (2003) and The Hub (2016)).

A £400m redevelopment of part of East Kilbride shopping centre was approved in 2006 by South Lanarkshire Council. The plan proposed demolishing some existing buildings to create a new civic centre, health centre, library and shopping facilities.

A branch of the government's Department for International Development, now the Foreign, Commonwealth and Development Office, is located in the western Hairmyres area of East Kilbride.

The newly renovated Olympia opened late 2016, renamed "The Hub".

Religion
There are approximately 30 Christian churches in East Kilbride. This includes nine Church of Scotland churches, three Baptist churches, and four Roman Catholic churches. St Bride's RC church is a category A listed building. St Mark's Episcopal church is situated in the Murray. There is one Lutheran parish of the Evangelical Lutheran Church of England, which is located in the Westwoodhill area. An Evangelical Christian congregation is also located in the Westwood area. The Church of Jesus Christ of Latter Day Saints meeting hall is situated in Vancouver Drive, Westwood. Two congregations of Jehovah's Witnesses share a Kingdom Hall near the centre of the town. The Christadelphians meet in Calderwood Community Centre. There are two United Reformed Churches, one in the Village, and one in the Murray. In the Greenhills area is a congregation of the Methodist church, whose premises are currently shared by the Seventh Day Adventist church. An Islamic Centre opened in 2018.

Transport

East Kilbride is connected to Glasgow city centre by road and rail. Three main roads connect East Kilbride with surrounding suburbs and the city, one being the A727 (formerly A726) leading west to Busby and on to Clarkston Toll. Another route being the A749 which runs north into Rutherglen. Recently, the addition of the Glasgow Southern Orbital road links the west of the town directly with Newton Mearns and the M77; this road has taken over the designation A726. Similar to other New Towns, the road network within the area is populated by many roundabouts; Glaswegians jokingly refer to East Kilbride as "Polo mint City" after the round, mint sweet. The main dual carriageway road running north–south through the town is known as the Kingsway, while the main east–west road is known as the Queensway.

Public transport
East Kilbride bus station, at the East Kilbride Shopping Centre, was rebuilt in June 2005 with modern facilities, including 14 rapid drive-through stances, allowing quick turnover of buses. East Kilbride railway station is situated in the Village, about a 10-minute walk from the bus station. Trains depart to Glasgow Central railway station every half-hour, with a journey time of about 27 minutes. The town is also served by Hairmyres railway station in Hairmyres.

East Kilbride's primary bus operator is First Glasgow which provides regular services to the city centre, Busby, Clarkston, Castlemilk, Rutherglen, Blantyre, Hamilton, Motherwell and to many other destinations across Greater Glasgow. McGill's Bus Services provide a service linking East Kilbride to Eaglesham, Newton Mearns, Barrhead, Neilston and Uplawmoor as well as another service to Cambuslang and Halfway. JMB Travel and Whitelaws Coaches also run services in the area.

Bus station

East Kilbride bus station is managed and operated by the Strathclyde Partnership for Transport. It is situated by East Kilbride Shopping Centre and is situated right outside the Princes Mall section of the Shopping Centre, and is easily accessible from the Olympia Arcade section also. It is approximately a 10-minute walk from the town's rail station. 

The current bus station went under a major £4 million expansion and re-planning of the existing site to form 14 rapid drive-through stances with new travel centre and CAB facility at the eastern gateway to the Town Centre. The bus station, which was designed by the architectural firm CDA, opened in 2005. The brief given to the designers was that they were "to achieve a fast turn around of buses, safe pedestrian/vehicular segregation and a secure and accessible environment set within an attractive urban realm".

There are 14 stances (stands) at the bus station that are equipped with electronic displays showing the next few departures. There is also a Travel Centre which is open Saturdays between 9.00 a.m. and 5:00 p.m. The operators at the bus station are First Glasgow, McGill's Bus Services, JMB Travel and Whitelaw's Coaches.

Cycling
Many of the busy roundabouts in East Kilbride feature underpasses which allow pedestrians and cyclists safe access across roads. On 19 June 2009, National Cycling Route 756, connecting East Kilbride and Rutherglen with the City Boundary, was opened. In November 2007, South Lanarkshire Council published three cycle routes, named the "East Kilbride Cycle Network" which start at the East Kilbride Shopping Centre in the centre of the town and are signposted. Route One is route is to Strathaven, via Newlandsmuir; Route Two to St Leonard's Shopping Centre, and Route Three is to Calderglen Country Park. Incidentally East Kilbride prior to new town development was a prized health resort, with cycling being a popular pastime there from the late 19th to early 20th centuries.

Landmarks

A seated statue of Sir Walter Scott is located at the corner of Old Coach Road and Markethill Road.

The James Hamilton Heritage Park is a park primarily containing a  manmade loch with watersports facilities and surrounding nature sanctuary, adjacent to the Category A listed, 15th-century Mains Castle, now a private residence.

Dollan Aqua Centre
One of the most significant buildings of an earlier phase of development was Dollan Baths leisure complex (opened 1968) which has category A listed status. The Aqua Centre re-opened on 28 May 2011 after a major refurbishment costing £6.5 million.

Long Calderwood Farm

Formerly Hunter House Museum, the building contained exhibits relating to the medical and veterinary pioneers, doctors William and John Hunter, who were born on the estate.

St Brides's Church

St Bride's Church is one of the buildings in East Kilbride and was designed by the architects Gillespie, Kidd and Coia and built between 1957 and 1964.

Langlands Moss
A local nature reserve which comprises a Lowland Raised Peat Bog, a UK BAP priority habitat. The reserve is owned by South Lanarkshire Council and maintained by The Friends of Langlands Moss L.N.R.

Parks and sports

East Kilbride YM FC is the town's oldest football club, founded in 1921.

East Kilbride Thistle Juniors also operate from The Show Park in The Village.

East Kilbride F.C. from the Scottish Lowland Football League, is based in the town, and play at the K-Park Training Academy at Calderglen Country Park. 

East Kilbride RFC were formed in 1968 and are based at the Torrance House Arena, at Calderglen Country Park. From 1976 they rose steadily through the leagues, peaking for three years in Premier 2. They now play in the West Regional League 1, the fourth tier of club rugby. They run two senior men's teams and numerous youth teams which are linked to the local schools. Retired Scotland national player, Alasdair Strokosch, played through all the youth levels at EKRFC.

East Kilbride Pirates are the country's top American football team and play in the BAFA Community Leagues.

EK82 Handball Club Founded in 1972, they train at the John Wright Sports Centre and the Alistair McCoist Complex.

Twin town
  Ballerup, Denmark (1965)

Education

Primary schools

 Auldhouse Primary School, Langlands Road 
 Blacklaw Primary School, Glen Arroch
 Canberra Primary School, Belmont Drive
 Castlefield Primary School, Lickprivick Road
 Crosshouse Primary School, Curlew Drive
 East Milton Primary School, Vancouver Drive
 Greenhills Primary School, Cedar Drive
 Halfmerke Primary School, Logie Park
 Heathery Knowe Primary School, Whitehills Terrace
 Hunter Primary School, Calderwood Road
 Kirktonholme Primary School, Dornoch Place
 Long Calderwood Primary School, Bosworth Road

 Maxwellton Primary School/Greenburn Primary School, Calderwood Road
 Mossneuk Primary School, Mossneuk Drive
 Mount Cameron Primary School, Blacklaw Drive 
 Murray Primary School, Napier Hill
 Our Lady of Lourdes Primary School, Carnegie Hill
 South Park Primary School, Netherton Road
 St. Hilary's Primary School, High Common Road
 St. Kenneth's Primary School, West Mains Road
 St. Leonard's Primary School, Brancumhall Road
 St. Louise's Primary School, Whitehills Terrace
 St. Vincent's Primary School, Crosshouse Road

Additional support needs
 Greenburn Primary School, Calderwood Road
 West Mains School, Logie Park

High schools
Calderglen High School, High Common Road
Duncanrig Secondary School, Winnipeg Drive
St Andrew's and St Bride's High School, Platthorn Drive

Additional support needs
 Sanderson High School, High Common Road

Further education
South Lanarkshire College, College Way

Notable people
Jim Reid (born 1961), lead singer of The Jesus and Mary Chain; born in East Kilbride

Notes

References

External links

 
 Interactive picture guide of East Kilbride

 
New towns in Scotland
Towns in South Lanarkshire
Greater Glasgow
Civil parishes of Scotland
Burghs
New towns started in the 1940s